Timothy Carson Crakanthorp is an Australian politician. He has been a Labor member of the New South Wales Legislative Assembly since 25 October 2014, when he was elected in a by-election to the seat of Newcastle. When he was elected he was a serving member of Newcastle City Council.

Crakanthorp is currently the Shadow Minister for Skills and TAFE, and the Shadow Minister for Tertiary Education in the NSW Shadow Cabinet.

References

External links

 

Year of birth missing (living people)
Labor Left politicians
Living people
Members of the New South Wales Legislative Assembly
New South Wales local councillors
Place of birth missing (living people)
Australian Labor Party members of the Parliament of New South Wales
21st-century Australian politicians